Out of the Storm is a collection of fantasy short stories by William Hope Hodgson.  It was first published in 1975 by Donald M. Grant, Publisher, Inc. in an edition of 2,100 copies.

Contents
 "William Hope Hodgson (The Early Years, Novelist, The Final Years)", by Sam Moskowitz
 "A Tropical Horror"
 "Out of the Storm"
 "The Finding of the Graiken"
 "Eloi Eloi Lama Sabachthani"
 "Terror of the Water-Tank"
 "The Albatross"
 "The Haunting of the Lady Shannon"

Publication history
1980, US, Centaur Books , Pub date 1980, Paperback

References

1975 short story collections
Fantasy short story collections
Short story collections by William Hope Hodgson
Donald M. Grant, Publisher books